The 1956 United States presidential election in Idaho took place on November 6, 1956, as part of the 1956 United States presidential election. State voters chose four representatives, or electors, to the Electoral College, who voted for president and vice president.

Idaho was won by incumbent President Dwight D. Eisenhower (R–Pennsylvania), running with Vice President Richard Nixon, with 61.17% of the popular vote, against Adlai Stevenson (D–Illinois), running with Senator Estes Kefauver, with 38.78% of the popular vote.

Results

Results by county

See also
 United States presidential elections in Idaho

Notes

References

Idaho
1956
1956 Idaho elections